Aleksander Kandaurov (born 17 January 1956, in Moscow, Soviet Union) is a Russian draughts player (Russian and Brazilian draughts) who has been the first world champion in draughts-64 (Brazilian version) in 1985, four-time champion USSR in Russian draughts (1982, 1987, 1989, 1991). Also played in International draughts. International grandmaster (GMI) since 1986.

External links
Rating list Men on 01.01.2015//section-64

References

1956 births
Living people
Sportspeople from Moscow
Russian draughts players
Soviet draughts players
Players of international draughts
Players of Russian draughts
Players of Brazilian draughts